Chopinzinho is a municipality in the state of Paraná in the Southern Region of Brazil.

Notable people
Elize Matsunaga—murderer. Subject of the Netflix documentary Elize Matsunaga: Once Upon a Crime.

See also
List of municipalities in Paraná

References

Municipalities in Paraná